Anata ga Koko ni Itara (あなたがここにいたら) (English: If you were here) is the twenty-third single by the Japanese Pop-rock band Porno Graffitti. It was released on February 13, 2008.

Track listing

References

2008 singles
Porno Graffitti songs
2008 songs
SME Records singles
Japanese film songs
Billboard Japan Hot 100 number-one singles
Oricon Weekly number-one singles